A particle in cell simulation for non-Abelian (colored) particles and fields. Can be used to simulate an equilibrium or non-equilibrium quark-gluon plasma.

References
 
 
 

Quantum chromodynamics
Plasma physics